Iryna Shchetnik (born 31 October 1999) is a Ukrainian Paralympic sport shooter. She won the bronze medal in the women's 10-metre air rifle standing SH1 event at the 2020 Summer Paralympics held in Tokyo, Japan.

References

External links
 

Living people
1999 births
Place of birth missing (living people)
Ukrainian female sport shooters
Shooters at the 2020 Summer Paralympics
Medalists at the 2020 Summer Paralympics
Paralympic medalists in shooting
Paralympic bronze medalists for Ukraine
Paralympic shooters of Ukraine
21st-century Ukrainian women